Mohammadi may refer to:

Places
Mohammadi, Uttar Pradesh, India
Mohammadi, Bushehr, Iran
Mohammadi, Hamadan, Iran
Mohammadi, Shahreza, Isfahan Province, Iran
Mohammadi, Tiran and Karvan, Isfahan Province, Iran
Mohammadi, Kerman, Iran
Mohammadi-ye Olya, Kermanshah Province, Iran
Mohammadi-ye Sofla, Kermanshah Province, Iran
Mohammadi, Khuzestan, Iran
Muhammadi, Markazi, Iran

Other uses
Mohammadi (surname)
The Mohammadi, a defunct Bengali-language art journal